The 2006 1000 km of Jarama was the fifth and final race of the 2006 Le Mans Series season run by the ACO. It was run on 24 September 2006.

This race was originally scheduled to be run at Monza, but had to be moved to Jarama due to a scheduling conflict at Monza.

Official results

Class winners in bold.  Cars failing to complete 70% of winner's distance marked as Not Classified (NC).

† - #97 GPC Sport entry was disqualified due to having a driver in the car for more than 4 hours.

Statistics
 Pole Position - #17 Pescarolo Sport - 1:23.242
 Fastest Lap - #12 Courage Competition - 1:24.570
 Average Speed - 151.644 km/h

External links

J
1000 km Jarama
1000 km